Ciceronia is a genus of flowering plants in the family Asteraceae.

There is only one known species, Ciceronia chaptalioides, endemic to Cuba.

References

Eupatorieae
Monotypic Asteraceae genera
Flora of Cuba